Wagner & Co. Solar Technology is a German-based solar power company. Its main headquarters are located at Cölbe, Germany. The company's products include solar, solar thermal and pellet-heating systems. The company has branches in France, Spain, the United Kingdom and the United States.

History
Wagner & Co. was founded in 1979 in Germany by a group of environmental technology students. The students wanted to create an ecological alternative to environmental damage and nuclear energy. This desire led to the development and production of a range of solar thermal systems, photovoltaic systems and wood pellet heating systems (Solar Thermal World). Wagner now is a staff-owned company that employs more than 400 employees within a democratic company structure.

Awards
In 2010, Wagner & Co was nominated as one of the top three most sustainable brands in the running for the German Sustainability Award (Deutscher).

References

Further reading
 
 
 A Passion for Solar Technology: Wagner Celebrates its 30th Anniversary | Solarthermalworld
 Deutscher Nachhaltigkeitspreis : English Summary

External links

Official website
Solar Generator

Solar energy companies of Germany
Companies based in Hesse